Acrochalix is a genus of medium-sized sea snails, marine gastropod mollusks in the family Eulimidae.

Distribution

This species is mainly distributed within the north Atlantic Ocean.

Species

There is only one known species within this genus:
  Acrochalix callosa Bouchet & Warén, 1986

References

External links
 To World Register of Marine Species

Eulimidae